1815 in sports describes the year's events in world sport.

Boxing
Events
 Tom Cribb retains his English championship but no fights involving him are recorded in 1815.

Cricket
Events
 The earliest known first-class centuries at the new Lord's Cricket Ground are scored in the Middlesex v Epsom match on 24 & 25 August by Felix Ladbroke and Frederick Woodbridge who score 116 and 107 respectively for Epsom.
England
 Most runs – William Lambert 172 (HS 50)
 Most wickets – Henry Bentley 15 (BB 4–?)

Horse racing
England
 1,000 Guineas Stakes – filly by Selim 
 2,000 Guineas Stakes – Tigris 
 The Derby – Whisker
 The Oaks – Minuet
 St. Leger Stakes – Filho da Puta

References

 
1815